Chris Erickson (born 1 December 1981) is an Australian racewalker who competed at two Olympiads: in 2008 and 2012 over the 20 km distance. He is also a multiple Australian national champion over the 50 km distance

References

|

1981 births
Living people
Australian male racewalkers
Olympic athletes of Australia
Athletes (track and field) at the 2008 Summer Olympics
Athletes (track and field) at the 2012 Summer Olympics
World Athletics Championships athletes for Australia
Athletes (track and field) at the 2006 Commonwealth Games
Athletes (track and field) at the 2010 Commonwealth Games
Athletes (track and field) at the 2016 Summer Olympics
Commonwealth Games medallists in athletics
Commonwealth Games bronze medallists for Australia
21st-century Australian people
Medallists at the 2006 Commonwealth Games